The first railway bridge at Kehl across the Rhine was opened in May 1861. Since then the bridge has been partially or fully destroyed more than once.

The Kehl railway bridge constructed in 1956, was a single track railway bridge between Strasbourg and Kehl, crossing in the process both the Rhine and the frontier between Germany and France.

A replacement double track railway bridge was first used on 10 October 2010 and formally opened in December 2010 in order to permit trains to cross the river more rapidly. The speed limit on the new bridge is 160 km/h (100 mph).

The 1861 bridge 

Under the terms of an international convention dated 2 July 1857 between Baden and the French government it was agreed that a railway bridge should be constructed across the Rhine between Kehl and Strasbourg. This would be the first permanent bridge across the Upper Rhine.

Work began in 1858, the Compagnie des chemins de fer de l'Est taking responsibility for the foundations.

The steel superstructure was delivered and assembled by "Gebrüder Benckiser" (Benckiser Brothers), a Pforzheim company.
 
The bridge became operational on 11 May 1861.

The outbreak in 1870 of the Franco-Prussian War saw the turntable on the eastern (Kehl) end of the bridge dynamited. Until a new steel structure could be erected in 1874, a provisional timber structure was put in place. As a result of the war the frontier moved: between 1871 and 1919 both ends of the bridge were located in and wholly owned by Germany, but in 1919 it was stipulated under the terms of the Treaty of Versailles that the bridge would be wholly owned by France. This was consistent with France's military occupation, under the terms of the treaty, of the formerly German Rhineland: the occupation continued in various forms until 1930.

By this time a project had reached the planning stage to replace the bridge which by now was more than 75 years old, but no such replacement would be built till well after the Second World War. With the outbreak of war in the late summer of 1939, French troops blew up the bridge's main western support. Until September 1940 the bridge could nevertheless be used courtesy of temporary repairs undertaken. In November 1944 German troops blew up the bridge's main eastern support, effectively destroying the bridge in its totality.

Replacing the 1861 bridge: the 1956 bridge 

In July 1945 U.S. engineering troops constructed a military kit based provisional single-track bridge.

On 30 January 1953 an agreement was signed between France and Germany concerning permanent bridges and transit over the Rhine on the Franco-German frontier (Abkommen über die festen Brücken und Fähren über den Rhein an der deutsch-französischen Grenze). This included provision for new railway bridges connecting Kehl and Strasbourg. Two separate single-track bridges were envisaged, one for each direction of travel, but a second bridge of this nature was never actually built.

Work began on the first single track rail bridge in May 1954. This is a triple span post-free trellis frame steel bridge supported by a continuous beam. The bridge was opened on 12 August 1956. The frontier was set at the midpoint of the bridge: Germany owns the eastern half and France owns the western half.

Complementing the 1956 bridge: the 2010 bridge 

On 14 March 2006 France and Germany agreed the framework for the construction of the extended high speed LGV Est railway line. The project required that trains be able to cross the Rhine at Kehl at speeds of up to 120 km/h (75 mph) at a time when the single track 1956 bridge was restricted to 60 km/h (37 mph). Provision was therefore made for a twin track bridge. Work began in March 2008 with completion scheduled for the end of 2010.

Clearance for river traffic at high water and flood levels must be at least .

References 

Bridges over the Rhine
Bridges completed in 1956
Bridges completed in 1861
Bridges completed in 2010
International bridges in France
International bridges in Germany
Railway bridges in France
Railway bridges in Germany
1861 establishments in Europe
Buildings and structures in Strasbourg
Transport in Strasbourg
Bridges in Baden-Württemberg
France–Germany border crossings
21st-century architecture in France